

Events

Pre-1600
45 BC – In his last victory, Julius Caesar defeats the Pompeian forces of Titus Labienus and Pompey the Younger in the Battle of Munda.
 180 – Commodus becomes sole emperor of the Roman Empire at the age of eighteen, following the death of his father, Marcus Aurelius.
 455 – Petronius Maximus becomes, with support of the Roman Senate, emperor of the Western Roman Empire; he forces Licinia Eudoxia, the widow of his predecessor, Valentinian III, to marry him.
1337 – Edward, the Black Prince is made Duke of Cornwall, the first Duchy in England.
1400 – Turko-Mongol emperor Timur sacks Damascus.

1601–1900
1776 – American Revolution: The British Army evacuates Boston, ending the Siege of Boston, after George Washington and Henry Knox place artillery in positions overlooking the city.
1805 – The Italian Republic, with Napoleon as president, becomes the Kingdom of Italy, with Napoleon as King of Italy.
1824 – The Anglo-Dutch Treaty is signed in London, dividing the Malay archipelago. As a result, the Malay Peninsula is dominated by the British, while Sumatra and Java and surrounding areas are dominated by the Dutch.
1842 – The Female Relief Society of Nauvoo is formally organized with Emma Smith as president.
1860 – The First Taranaki War begins in Taranaki, New Zealand, a major phase of the New Zealand Wars.
1861 – The Kingdom of Italy is proclaimed.
1862 – The first railway line of Finland between cities of Helsinki and Hämeenlinna, called Päärata, is officially opened.

1901–present
1921 – The Second Polish Republic adopts the March Constitution.
1942 – Holocaust: The first Jews from the Lvov Ghetto are gassed at the Belzec death camp in what is today eastern Poland.
1945 – The Ludendorff Bridge in Remagen, Germany, collapses, ten days after its capture.
1948 – Belgium, France, Luxembourg, the Netherlands and the United Kingdom sign the Treaty of Brussels, a precursor to the North Atlantic Treaty establishing NATO.
1950 – Researchers at the University of California, Berkeley announce the creation of element 98, which they name "californium".
1957 – A plane crash in Cebu, Philippines kills Philippine President Ramon Magsaysay and 24 others.
1958 – The United States launches the first solar-powered satellite, which is also the first satellite to achieve a long-term orbit.
1960 – U.S. President Dwight D. Eisenhower signs the National Security Council directive on the anti-Cuban covert action program that will ultimately lead to the Bay of Pigs Invasion.
1960   – Northwest Orient Airlines Flight 710 crashes in Tobin Township, Perry County, Indiana, killing 63.
1963 – Mount Agung erupts on Bali killing more than 1,100 people.
1966 – Off the coast of Spain in the Mediterranean, the  submarine finds a missing American hydrogen bomb.
1968 – As a result of nerve gas testing by the U.S. Army Chemical Corps in Skull Valley, Utah, over 6,000 sheep are found dead.
1969 – Golda Meir becomes the first female Prime Minister of Israel.
1973 – The Pulitzer Prize-winning photograph Burst of Joy is taken, depicting a former prisoner of war being reunited with his family, which came to symbolize the end of United States involvement in the Vietnam War.
1979 – The Penmanshiel Tunnel collapses during engineering works, killing two workers.
1985 – Serial killer Richard Ramirez, aka the "Night Stalker", commits the first two murders in his Los Angeles murder spree.
1988 – A Colombian Boeing 727 jetliner, Avianca Flight 410, crashes into a mountainside near the Venezuelan border killing 143.
  1988   – Eritrean War of Independence: The Nadew Command, an Ethiopian army corps in Eritrea, is attacked on three sides by military units of the Eritrean People's Liberation Front in the opening action of the Battle of Afabet.
1992 – Israeli Embassy attack in Buenos Aires: Car bomb attack kills 29 and injures 242.
  1992   – A referendum to end apartheid in South Africa is passed 68.7% to 31.2%.
2000 – Five hundred and thirty members of the Ugandan cult Movement for the Restoration of the Ten Commandments of God die in a fire, considered to be a mass murder or suicide orchestrated by leaders of the cult. Elsewhere another 248 members are later found dead.
2003 – Leader of the House of Commons and Lord President of the Council, Robin Cook, resigns from the British Cabinet in disagreement with government plans for the 2003 invasion of Iraq.
2004 – Unrest in Kosovo: More than 22 are killed and 200 wounded. Thirty-five Serbian Orthodox shrines in Kosovo and two mosques in Serbia are destroyed.
2016 – Rojava conflict: At a conference in Rmelan, the Movement for a Democratic Society declares the establishment of the Democratic Federation of Northern Syria.

Births

Pre-1600
 763 – Harun al-Rashid, Abbasid caliph (d. 809)
1231 – Emperor Shijō of Japan (d. 1242)
1473 – James IV of Scotland (d. 1513)
1523 – Giovanni Francesco Commendone, Catholic cardinal (d. 1584)
1537 – Toyotomi Hideyoshi, Japanese daimyō (d. 1598)

1601–1900
1611 – Robert Douglas, Count of Skenninge, Swedish field marshal (d. 1662)
1665 – Élisabeth Jacquet de La Guerre, French harpsichord player and composer (d. 1729)
1676 – Thomas Boston, Scottish philosopher and theologian (d. 1732)
1686 – Jean-Baptiste Oudry, French painter and engraver (d. 1755)
1725 – Lachlan McIntosh, Scottish-American general and politician (d. 1806)
1777 – Patrick Brontë, Irish-English priest and author (d. 1861)
  1777   – Roger B. Taney, American politician and jurist, 5th Chief Justice of the United States (d. 1864)
1780 – Thomas Chalmers, Scottish minister, economist, and educator (d. 1847)
1781 – Ebenezer Elliott, English poet and educator (d. 1849)
1804 – Jim Bridger, American fur trader and explorer (d. 1881)
1806 – Norbert Rillieux, African American inventor and chemical engineer (d. 1894)
1820 – Jean Ingelow, English poet and author (d. 1897)
1834 – Gottlieb Daimler, German engineer and businessman, co-founded Daimler-Motoren-Gesellschaft (d. 1900)
1839 – Josef Rheinberger, Liechtensteiner-German organist and composer (d. 1901)
1842 – Rosina Heikel, Finnish physician (d. 1929)
1846 – Kate Greenaway, English author and illustrator (d. 1901)
1849 – Charles F. Brush, American businessman and philanthropist, co-invented the Arc lamp (d. 1929)
  1849   – Cornelia Clapp, American marine biologist (d. 1934)
1856 – Mikhail Vrubel, Russian painter (d. 1910)
1862 – Martha P. Falconer, American social reformer (d. 1941)
1862 – Silvio Gesell, Belgian merchant and economist (d. 1930)
1864 – Joseph Baptista, Indian engineer, lawyer, and politician (d. 1930)
1866 – Pierce Butler, American lawyer and jurist (d. 1939)
1867 – Patrice Contamine de Latour, Spanish poet (d. 1926)
1877 – Edith New, English militant suffragette (d. 1951)
  1877   – Otto Gross, Austrian-German psychoanalyst and philosopher (d. 1920)
1880 – Patrick Hastings, English lawyer and politician, Attorney General for England and Wales (d. 1952)
  1880   – Lawrence Oates, English lieutenant and explorer (d. 1912)
1881 – Walter Rudolf Hess, Swiss physiologist and academic, Nobel Prize laureate (d. 1973)
1884 – Alcide Nunez, American clarinet player (d. 1934)
1885 – Ralph Rose, American track and field athlete (d. 1913)
1886 – Princess Patricia of Connaught (d. 1974)
1888 – Paul Ramadier, French lawyer and politician, Prime Minister of France (d. 1961)
1889 – Harry Clarke, Irish stained-glass artist and book illustrator (d. 1931)
1891 – Ross McLarty, Australian politician, 17th Premier of Western Australia (d. 1962)
1892 – Floyd B. Barnum, American college football coach (d. 1965)
  1892   – Sayed Darwish, Egyptian singer-songwriter and producer (d. 1923)
1894 – Paul Green, American playwright and academic (d. 1981)
1895 – Lloyd Rees, Australian painter (d. 1988)
1900 – Alfred Newman, American composer and conductor (d. 1970)

1901–present
1902 – Bobby Jones, American golfer and lawyer (d. 1971)
1904 – Chaim Gross, Austrian-American sculptor and educator (d. 1991)
1905 – Lillian Yarbo, American comedienne, dancer, and singer (d. 1996)
1908 – Brigitte Helm, German-Swiss actress (d. 1996)
1907 – Jean Van Houtte, Belgian academic and politician, 50th Prime Minister of Belgium (d. 1991)
  1907   – Takeo Miki, Japanese politician, 41st Prime Minister of Japan (d. 1988)
1910 – Sonny Werblin, American businessman and philanthropist (d. 1991)
1912 – Bayard Rustin, American activist (d. 1987)
1914 – Sammy Baugh, American football player and coach (d. 2008)
1915 – Robert S. Arbib Jr., American ornithologist, writer and conservationist (d. 1987)  
  1915   – Bill Roycroft, Australian equestrian rider (d. 2011)
1916 – Ray Ellington, English drummer and bandleader (d. 1985)
1919 – Nat King Cole, American singer, pianist, and television host (d. 1965)
1920 – Sheikh Mujibur Rahman, Bangladeshi politician, 1st President of Bangladesh (d. 1975)
1921 – Meir Amit, Israeli general and politician, 12th Israeli Minister of Communications (d. 2009)
1922 – Patrick Suppes, American psychologist and philosopher (d. 2014)
1924 – Stephen Dodgson, English composer and educator (d. 2013)
1925 – Gabriele Ferzetti, Italian actor (d. 2015)
1926 – Siegfried Lenz, Polish-German author and playwright (d. 2014)
1927 – Betty Allen, American soprano and educator (d. 2009)
1928 – William John McKeag, Canadian businessman and politician, 17th Lieutenant Governor of Manitoba (d. 2007)
1930 – Paul Horn, American-Canadian flute player and saxophonist (d. 2014)
  1930   – James Irwin, American colonel, pilot, and astronaut (d. 1991)
1931 – Patricia Breslin, American actress (d. 2011)
  1931   – David Peakall, English-American chemist and toxicologist (d. 2001)
1933 – Myrlie Evers-Williams, American journalist and activist
  1933   – Penelope Lively, English author
1935 – Fred T. Mackenzie,  American biologist and academic
  1935   – Adam Wade, American singer, drummer, and actor (d. 2022)
1936 – Ida Kleijnen, Dutch chef (d. 2019)
  1936   – Ladislav Kupkovič, Slovakian composer and conductor (d. 2016)
  1936   – Ken Mattingly, American admiral, pilot, and astronaut
1937 – Galina Samsova, Russian ballerina
1938 – Rudolf Nureyev, Russian-French dancer and choreographer (d. 1993)
  1938   – Keith O'Brien, Northern Ireland-born Scottish cleric, theologian, and cardinal (d. 2018)
  1938   – Zola Taylor, American singer (d. 2007)
1939 – Jim Gary, American sculptor (d. 2006)
  1939   – Bill Graham, Canadian academic and politician, 4th Canadian Minister of Foreign Affairs
  1939   – Robin Knox-Johnston, English sailor and first person to perform a single-handed non-stop circumnavigation of the globe 
  1939   – Giovanni Trapattoni, Italian footballer and manager
1940 – Mark White, American lawyer and politician, 43rd Governor of Texas (d. 2017)
1941 – Wang Jin-pyng, Taiwanese soldier and politician
  1941   – Paul Kantner, American singer-songwriter and guitarist (d. 2016)
  1941   – Max Stafford-Clark, English director and academic
1942 – John Wayne Gacy, American serial killer and rapist (d. 1994)
1943 – Jeff Banks, Welsh fashion designer
  1943   – Andrew Brook, Canadian philosopher, author, and academic
1944 – Pattie Boyd, English model, author, and photographer
  1944   – Cito Gaston, American baseball player and manager
  1944   – John Sebastian, American singer-songwriter and guitarist 
1945 – Michael Hayden, American general, 20th Director of the Central Intelligence Agency
1947 – Dennis Bond, English footballer 
  1947   – Yury Chernavsky, Russian-American songwriter and producer
1948 – William Gibson, American-Canadian author and screenwriter
  1948   – Alex MacDonald, Scottish footballer and manager
1949 – Patrick Duffy, American actor, director, and producer
  1949   – Pat Rice, Irish footballer and coach
  1949   – Stuart Rose, English businessman
1951 – Scott Gorham, American singer-songwriter and guitarist 
  1951   – Craig Ramsay, Canadian ice hockey player and coach
  1951   – Kurt Russell, American actor and producer
1952 – Barry Horne, English activist (d. 2001)
1953 – Filemon Lagman, Filipino activist (d. 2001)
  1953   – Chuck Muncie, American football player (d. 2013)
1954 – Lesley-Anne Down, English actress 
1955 – Cynthia McKinney, American activist and politician
  1955   – Paul Overstreet, American singer-songwriter and guitarist
  1955   – Gary Sinise, American actor, director, and bass player 
1956 – Patrick McDonnell, American author and illustrator
  1956   – Rory McGrath, British comedian, television personality, and writer
1957 – Michael Kelly, American journalist and author (d. 2003)
1958 – Christian Clemenson, American actor
1959 – Danny Ainge, American baseball and basketball player
  1959   – Paul Black, American singer-songwriter and drummer 
1960 – Arye Gross, American actor
  1960   – Vicki Lewis, American actress and singer
1961 – Sam Bowie, American basketball player
  1961   – Dana Reeve, American actress, singer, and activist (d. 2006)
  1961   – Casey Siemaszko, American actor
1962 – Carsten Almqvist, Swedish business executive 
  1962   – Ank Bijleveld, Dutch politician
  1962   – Janet Gardner, American singer and guitarist 
  1962   – Clare Grogan, Scottish singer and actress
  1962   – Rob Sitch, Australian actor, director, and producer
1963 – Roger Harper, Guyanese cricketer and coach
1964 – Stefano Borgonovo, Italian footballer (d. 2013)
  1964   – Lee Dixon, English footballer and journalist
  1964   – Rob Lowe, American actor and producer
  1964   – Jacques Songo'o, Cameroonian footballer and coach
1965 – Andrew Hudson, South African cricketer
1966 – Andrew Rosindell, English journalist and politician
1967 – Jason Alchin, Australian rugby league player
  1967   – Billy Corgan, American singer-songwriter, guitarist, pianist, and producer 
  1967   – Barry Minkow, American pastor and businessman
1968 – Eri Nitta, Japanese singer-songwriter and actress 
  1968   – Mathew St. Patrick, American actor and producer
1969 – Edgar Grospiron, French skier
  1969   – Alexander McQueen, English fashion designer, founded own eponymous brand (d. 2010)
1970 – Patrick Lebeau, Canadian ice hockey player
  1970   – Gene Ween, American singer-songwriter and guitarist
  1970   – Darren Kenny, British Paralympic cyclist
1971 – Bill Mueller, American baseball player and coach
1972 – Melissa Auf der Maur, Canadian-American singer-songwriter and bass player 
  1972   – Torquil Campbell, English-Canadian singer-songwriter and actor
  1972   – Mia Hamm, American soccer player
1973 – Rico Blanco, Filipino singer-songwriter, guitarist, producer, and actor 
  1973   – Caroline Corr, Irish singer and drummer 
  1973   – Vance Wilson, American baseball player and manager
1974 – Mark Dolan, English comedian and television host
1975 – Justin Hawkins, English singer-songwriter 
  1975   – Puneeth Rajkumar, Indian actor, singer, and producer
  1975   – Test, Canadian-American wrestler (d. 2009)
  1975   – Natalie Zea, American actress
1976 – Scott Downs, American baseball player
  1976   – Stephen Gately, Irish singer-songwriter and actor (d. 2009)
  1976   – Álvaro Recoba, Uruguayan footballer 
1977 – Tamar Braxton, American singer-songwriter and actress 
1978 – Zachery Kouwe, American journalist
1979 – Stormy Daniels, American adult film actress
  1979   – Andrew Ference, Canadian ice hockey player
  1979   – Stephen Kramer Glickman, Canadian-American actor, director, producer, and fashion designer
  1979   – Mineko Nomachi, Japanese essayist
  1979   – Samoa Joe, American professional wrestler 
1980 – Danny Califf, American soccer player
  1980   – Aisam-ul-Haq Qureshi, Pakistani tennis player
1981 – Aaron Baddeley, American-Australian golfer
  1981   – Servet Çetin, Turkish footballer
  1981   – Kyle Korver, American basketball player
  1981   – Nicky Jam, American-Puerto-Rican singer and songwriter
1982 – Steven Pienaar, South African footballer
1983 – James Heath, English golfer
  1983   – Raul Meireles, Portuguese footballer
  1983   – Attila Vajda, Hungarian sprint canoeist
1984 – Ryan Rottman, American actor, producer, and screenwriter
1985 – Tuğba Karademir, Turkish-Canadian figure skater
1986 – Chris Davis, American baseball player
  1986   – Edin Džeko, Bosnian footballer
  1986   – Miles Kane, English singer-songwriter and guitarist 
  1986   – Silke Spiegelburg, German pole vaulter
1987 – Federico Fazio, Argentinian international footballer
  1987   – Krisnan Inu, New Zealand rugby league player
  1987   – Ryan Parent, Canadian ice hockey player
  1987   – Bobby Ryan, American ice hockey player
  1987   – Emmanuel Sanders, American football player
1988 – Rasmus Elm, Swedish footballer
  1988   – Fraser Forster, English footballer
  1988   – Grimes, Canadian artist, musician and music video director
  1988   – Ryan White, Canadian ice hockey player
1989 – Shinji Kagawa, Japanese footballer
  1989   – Harry Melling, English actor
1990 – Hozier, Irish singer-songwriter and musician
  1990   – Saina Nehwal, Indian badminton player
1991 – Jack De Belin, Australian rugby league player
1992 – Patrick Cantlay, American golfer
  1992   – John Boyega, English actor
1993 – Matteo Bianchetti, Italian footballer
1994 – Dean Britt, Australian rugby league player
1995 – Ashley Taylor, Australian rugby league player
1997 – Katie Ledecky, American swimmer

Deaths

Pre-1600
45 BC – Titus Labienus, Roman general (b. 100 BC)
  45 BC  – Publius Attius Varus, Roman governor of Africa
 180 – Marcus Aurelius, Roman emperor (b. 121)
 624 – Amr ibn Hishām, Arab polytheist
 659 – Gertrude of Nivelles, Frankish abbess
 836 – Haito, bishop of Basel
 905 – Li Yu, Prince of De, prince and emperor of the Tang Dynasty
1008 – Kazan, emperor of Japan (b. 968)
1040 – Harold Harefoot, king of England
1058 – Lulach, king of Scotland
1199 – Jocelin of Glasgow, Scottish monk and bishop (b. 1130)
1267 – Pierre de Montreuil, French architect
1270 – Philip of Montfort, French knight and nobleman 
1272 – Go-Saga, emperor of Japan (b. 1220)
1361 – An-Nasir Hasan, Mamluk sultan of Egypt
1394 – Louis of Enghien, French nobleman
1406 – Ibn Khaldun, Tunisian sociologist, historian, and scholar (b. 1332)
1425 – Ashikaga Yoshikazu, Japanese shōgun (b. 1407)
1516 – Giuliano de' Medici, Italian nobleman (b. 1479)
1527 – Rana Sanga, Indian ruler (b. 1482)
1565 – Alexander Ales, Scottish theologian and academic (b. 1500)

1601–1900
1611 – Sophia of Sweden, duchess of Saxe-Lauenburg (b. 1547)
1620 – John Sarkander, Polish-Moravian priest and saint (b. 1576)
1640 – Philip Massinger, English playwright (b. 1583)
1649 – Gabriel Lalemant, French missionary and saint (b. 1610)
1663 – Jerome Weston, 2nd Earl of Portland, English diplomat (b. 1605)
1680 – François de La Rochefoucauld, French author (b. 1613)
1704 – Menno van Coehoorn, Dutch soldier and engineer (b. 1641)
1715 – Gilbert Burnet, Scottish bishop and historian (b. 1643)
1741 – Jean-Baptiste Rousseau, French poet and playwright (b. 1671)
1764 – George Parker, 2nd Earl of Macclesfield, English astronomer and politician (b. 1695)
1782 – Daniel Bernoulli, Dutch-Swiss mathematician and physicist (b. 1700)
1828 – James Edward Smith, English botanist and entomologist (b. 1759)
1829 – Sophia Albertina, princess-abbess of Quedlinburg (b. 1753)
1830 – Laurent de Gouvion Saint-Cyr, French general and politician (b. 1764)
1846 – Friedrich Bessel, German astronomer, mathematician, and physicist (b. 1784)
1849 – William II, Dutch sovereign prince and king (b. 1792)
1853 – Christian Doppler, Austrian physicist and mathematician (b. 1803)
1871 – Robert Chambers, Scottish geologist and publisher, co-founded Chambers Harrap (b. 1802)
1875 – Ferdinand Laub, Czech violinist and composer (b. 1832)
1893 – Jules Ferry, French lawyer and politician, 44th Prime Minister of France (b. 1832)

1901–present
1917 – Franz Brentano, German philosopher and psychologist (b. 1838)
1926 – Aleksei Brusilov, Georgian-Russian general (b. 1853)
1940 – Philomène Belliveau, Canadian artist (b. 1854)
1946 – Dai Li, Chinese general (b. 1897)
1949 – Aleksandra Ekster, Russian-French painter and set designer (b. 1882)
1956 – Fred Allen, American actor, comedian, screenwriter, and author (b. 1894)
  1956   – Irène Joliot-Curie, French physicist and chemist, Nobel Prize laureate (b. 1897)
1957 – Ramon Magsaysay, Filipino captain and politician, 7th President of the Philippines (b. 1907)
1958 – John Pius Boland, Irish tennis player and politician (b. 1870)
  1958   – Bertha De Vriese, Belgian physician (b. 1877)
1961 – Susanna M. Salter, American activist and politician (b. 1860)
1965 – Amos Alonzo Stagg, American football player and coach (b. 1862)
1974 – Louis Kahn, American architect and academic, designed Jatiyo Sangsad Bhaban (b. 1901)
1976 – Luchino Visconti, Italian director and screenwriter (b. 1906)
1981 – Paul Dean, American baseball player (b. 1913)
1983 – Haldan Keffer Hartline, American physiologist and academic, Nobel Prize laureate (b. 1903)
  1983   – Louisa E. Rhine, American botanist and parapsychologist (b. 1891)
1986 – Clarence D. Lester, African-American fighter pilot (b.1923)
1990 – Capucine, French model and actress (b. 1928)
  1990   – Dinkar G. Kelkar, Indian art collector (b. 1896)
1992 – Grace Stafford, American actress (b. 1903)
1993 – Helen Hayes, American actress (b. 1900)
1994 – Charlotte Auerbach, German-Jewish Scottish folklorist, geneticist, and zoologist (b. 1899)
  1994   – Mai Zetterling, Swedish-English actress and director (b. 1925)
1995 – Sunnyland Slim, American blues pianist (b. 1906)
1996 – René Clément, French director and screenwriter (b. 1913)
  1996   – Terry Stafford, American singer-songwriter (b. 1941)
1997 – Jermaine Stewart, American singer-songwriter and dancer (b. 1957)
1999 – Ernest Gold, Austrian-American composer (b. 1921)
  1999   – Jean Pierre-Bloch, French activist (b. 1905)
2002 – Rosetta LeNoire, American actress and producer (b. 1911)
  2002   – Văn Tiến Dũng, Vietnamese general and politician, 6th Minister of Defence for Vietnam (b. 1917)
  2002   – Sylvester "Pat" Weaver, American television broadcaster and producer (b. 1908)
2005 – Royce Frith, Canadian lawyer, politician, and diplomat, Canadian High Commissioner to the United Kingdom (b. 1923)
  2005   – George F. Kennan, American historian and diplomat, United States Ambassador to the Soviet Union (b. 1904)
  2005   – Andre Norton, American author (b. 1912)
2006 – Oleg Cassini, French-American fashion designer (b. 1913)
  2006   – Ray Meyer, American basketball player and coach (b. 1913)
  2006   – İstemihan Taviloğlu, Turkish composer and educator (b. 1945)
2007 – John Backus, American mathematician and computer scientist, designed Fortran (b. 1924)
2008 – Roland Arnall, French-American businessman and diplomat, 63rd United States Ambassador to the Netherlands (b. 1939)
2009 – Clodovil Hernandes, Brazilian television host and politician (b. 1937)
2010 – Alex Chilton, American singer-songwriter, guitarist, and producer (b. 1950)
  2010   – Sid Fleischman, American author and screenwriter (b. 1920)
2011 – Michael Gough, English actor (b. 1916)
  2011   – Ferlin Husky, American country music singer (b. 1925)
2012 – Shenouda III, pope of Alexandria (b. 1923)
  2012   – Margaret Whitlam, Australian swimmer and author (b. 1919) 
2013 – William B. Caldwell III, American general (b. 1925)
  2013   – Lawrence Fuchs, American scholar and academic (b. 1927)
  2013   – A.B.C. Whipple, American journalist and historian (b. 1918)
2014 – Marek Galiński, Polish cyclist (b. 1974)
  2014   – Joseph Kerman, American musicologist and critic (b. 1924)
  2014   – Rachel Lambert Mellon, American gardener, philanthropist, art collector and political patron (b. 1910)
2015 – Frank Perris, Canadian motorcycle racer (b. 1931) 
2016 – Meir Dagan, Israeli general (b. 1945)
  2016   – Zoltán Kamondi, Hungarian director, producer, and screenwriter (b. 1960)
2018 – Mike MacDonald, Canadian comedian (b. 1954)
  2018   – Phan Văn Khải, the fifth Prime Minister of Vietnam (b. 1933)
2021 – John Magufuli, the fifth President of Tanzania (b. 1959)
2023 – Lance Reddick, American actor (b. 1962)

Holidays and observances
 Children's Day (Bangladesh)
 Christian feast day:
 Alexius of Rome (Eastern Church)
 Gertrude of Nivelles
 John Sarkander
 Joseph of Arimathea (Western Church)
 Patrick of Ireland
 March 17 (Eastern Orthodox liturgics)
 Evacuation Day (Suffolk County, Massachusetts)
 Saint Patrick's Day, a public holiday in Ireland, Montserrat and the Canadian province of Newfoundland and Labrador, widely celebrated in the English-speaking world and to a lesser degree in other parts of the world.

References

Bibliography

External links

 BBC: On This Day
 
 Historical Events on March 17

Days of the year
March